Cane River is a 1982 American romantic drama film that was lost until its rediscovery in 2013 and its subsequent re-release in 2018 and beyond. It was written, produced, and directed by Horace B. Jenkins. The film features the lives of African Americans in the US state of Louisiana. While the film premiered in New Orleans, Louisiana, in 1982, Horace Jenkins died before the film could be released in New York City and beyond. The film was considered lost until a negative was recovered in 2013.

Distributor Oscilloscope released it in select theaters in the United States in February 2020. During the COVID-19 pandemic, it was available via virtual cinema before premiering on The Criterion Collection's The Criterion Channel in May 2020. In the following August, Cane River was released on home video.

Synopsis

The New Orleans Film Society described the film, "Cane River is set near Natchitoches, in one of the first 'free communities of color.' Richard Romain plays Peter Metoyer, home to fight for his land, and Tommye Myrick plays the headstrong Maria Mathis, reluctant to succumb to his charms just because he's the scion of a famous family. Together they confront schisms of class and color that threaten to keep them apart and that still roil America today."

Production

Horace B. Jenkins filmed Cane River in New Orleans and Natchitoches Parish in the US state of Louisiana; St Augustine Church in Isle Brevelle was used in some scenes. Plantation scenes were filmed on the Melrose Plantation.  The production involved an all-black crew and featured an all-black cast. The film was financed by the prominent Rhodes family in New Orleans.

Sidney Poitier's daughter Pamela was originally cast as the female lead Martha Mathis, but she dropped out of the production and was replaced by Tommye Myrick. Richard Romain played the male lead. For swimming scenes, Romain taught Myrick how to swim.

The film's soundtrack includes music by New Orleans vocalist Phillip Manuel.

Release

Premiere in 1982
Cane River premiered in New Orleans, Louisiana in 1982. The New York Times said at the time, it was "already a rarity: a drama by an independent black filmmaker, financed by wealthy black patrons and dealing with race issues untouched by mainstream cinema". Cane River was scheduled to screen in New York City in February 1983, but with his death, the film went unreleased. Richard Pryor, who saw a screening of Cane River before Jenkins's death, had offered to place the film with the studio Warner Bros., with whom he had an agreement to distribute films made by African-Americans, but its producers declined the offer.

Rediscovery in 2013
The film was not publicly available until 2013, when the film preservation organization IndieCollect uncovered a negative copy from the vaults of DuArt Film and Video. The Academy Film Archive accepted Cane River sight unseen. IndieCollect's president and the Academy Archive's documentary curator investigated the recovered film and identified the filmmaker and uncovered the background behind the making of the film.

Two years after a negative resurfaced, The New York Timess John Anderson wrote, "It has attained a certain mythic quality, connecting a disparate group of people across the country: New York preservationists dedicated to restoring it; a cultural historian in Louisiana devoting an academic paper to it; an archivist in Los Angeles fascinated with it." The cultural historian, Keilah Spann, watched a bootleg DVD and said the film dealt with colorism in a way no other film had before. Spann found some scenes to be too long, a detail confirmed by the still-living editor Debra I. Moore, who said it was her first film editing along with a "first" for other crew members. Horace Jenkins's son, Sacha Jenkins, who was 11 years old when Cane River was released, is researching the film to create a documentary.

Re-release in 2018 and beyond

A new 35 mm archival print was created by the Academy Film Archive and was mastered in 4K resolution by IndieCollect with support from the Roger & Chaz Ebert Foundation. It screened at the Museum of Modern Art in New York in January 2019. It also screened at Ebertfest in April 2019.

Film distributor Oscilloscope acquired in October 2019 the distribution rights to Cane River. The Academy of Motion Picture Arts and Sciences screened Cane River in Los Angeles on November 1, 2020, with a panel discussion featuring lead actors Tommye Myrick and Richard Romain.

Following the COVID-19 pandemic that impacted US movie theaters in March 2020, Cane River was made available via virtual cinema, a film distribution strategy using video-on-demand streaming services to benefit art-house theaters, around the United States, including the BAM.

A month later, in support of the Black Lives Matter movement with the ongoing George Floyd protests, the service lifted its paywall for black-themed films, including Cane River, to be streamed for free.

In August 2020, Cane River was released on DVD and Blu-ray disc.

Critical reception

Following the film's re-release in the 21st century, review aggregator Rotten Tomatoes assessed a sample of 16 reviews as positive or negative and said 100% of the critics gave positive reviews with an average rating of 7.7 out of 10. The similar website Metacritic said the film had "generally favorable" reviews, assessing seven reviews as positive, mixed, or negative and classifying all seven as positive with an overall weighted score of 80 out of 100. In June 2020, The Hollywood Reporters film critics listed Cane River among "the 10 best movies of 2020 so far".

References

External links

1982 films
African-American films
Films set in Louisiana
Films shot in Louisiana
1982 romantic drama films
Rediscovered American films
1980s rediscovered films
American romantic drama films
Natchitoches, Louisiana
1980s English-language films
1980s American films